The Party of Pensioners of Russia;) was a centrist political party in Russia that existed in 2012-2019 under the chairmanship of Nikolai Chebotaryov, executive director of the Union of Pensioners of Russia.

In 2018, following the results of the elections to the Legislative Assembly of the Zabaykalsky Krai, party gained 6.04%, having received 1 seat and a privilege to participate in the elections to the State Duma in 2021 without collecting signatures.

On June 13, 2019, as a result of a planned inspection by the Ministry of Justice, the Supreme Court liquidated the Party of Pensioners of Russia for insufficient participation in regional elections for seven years.

History 
The party was created at the founding congress on May 15, 2012 on the basis of the Union of Pensioners of Russia, chaired by the Head of the Federation Council Committee on Social Policy Valery Ryazansky, the chairman and deputy of the party are the leaders of the Union of Pensioners of Russia.

In 2012, in the elections to the Legislative Assembly of Penza Oblast, she received 11,969 (2.20%) votes, to the Yaroslavl City Duma, 4,382 (3.88%) votes, passed to the City Duma of the city of Kamensk-Uralsky, Sverdlovsk Oblast, gaining 2,444 (9.38%) votes.

In 2018, following the results of the elections to the Legislative Assembly of the Zabaykalsky Krai, she gained 6.04%, having received 1 seat and a privilege to participate in the elections to the State Duma in 2021 without collecting signatures. Alexander Mikhailov was elected to the Legislative Assembly. However, the party did not manage to exercise its right, and a year later the court liquidated the party. Also, the party entered the Council of Deputies of the city of Monchegorsk, Murmansk Oblast, gaining 13.8% of the vote.

References

Defunct political parties in Russia
Pensioners' parties